Keep Safe Distance is a 2019 Indian drama film directed by Raama Mehra with Kiran Kumar, Shahbaz Khan, Mushtaq Khan and Laxman Singh Rajput.

Plot
The story of the film shows the life of a Call girl. Sonia, a little girl who lost her family due to flooding in Assam, arrives in Mumbai with her mother. Circumstances make the girl a famous Call girl as she grows up, and becomes famous as Sonia ATM. Sonia ATM also has relationships with underworld Don Salim Sultan. On one occasion, Sonia ATM meets ACP Vijay Suryavanshi, who is looking for the underworld Don Salim Sultan. ACP Vijay says Sonia ATM that if she helps him in arresting Don Salim Sultan, he will marry her, for which Sonia ATM agrees. Don Salim Sultan's information on the tour of India gives Sonia to Vijay, and thus Vijay reaches the spot to capture Don. But Sonia ATM shoots herself after hearing a call girl herself from Vijay's mouth and thus Salim Sultan escapes and runs away from India. The film depicts Mumbai's crime as well as the underworld and film industry issues.

Cast
 Kiran Kumar 
 Shahbaz Khan
 Mushtaq Khan
 Adi Irani
 Vikas Anand
 Laxman Singh Rajput
 Jai Yadav
 Sagarika Neha
 Indrajeet Singh

Filming
The film is mostly shot in Mumbai, Maharashtra, Gujrat, Rajasthan and some parts in Daman and Diu.

Soundtrack 

The music of the film is composed by Damodar Rao and sung by Kalpana Patowary while lyrics are by RPS Janaab.

References

External links

2010s Hindi-language films
Indian drama films
Hindi-language drama films